= Mahila Paksh =

Newspaper in India

- Type: Newspaper
- Owner: Shrivastava family
- Editor-in-chief: Samnvy Kumar
- Membership fee: Two dollars and fifty cents per year
- Language: Hindi
- Headquarters: Gwalior, Madhya Pradesh, India
- City: Gwalior
- Country: India

Mahila Paksh is an Indian women's newspaper published in Gwalior, Madhya Pradesh, in Hindi. It covers issues and subjects ranging from atrocities committed against women to following their successes in different fields. It is published by the Shrivastava family. The paper operates through the creation of members, which it does through signing up people at a fee of two dollars and fifty cents per year.

The paper's quoted mission, as expressed by Samnvy Kumar, the chief editor of the newspaper: "Our main purpose is to create awareness in the women not about the social issues but awareness for the self. They don't understand themselves and realise their potential. We want them to recognise their potential, caliber and capability. They can take their own independent decisions."

The newspaper has women filing stories across India- but includes many stories that are compiled by poor and illiterate women who are relatively disenfranchised and generally prevented from speaking out about their perceptions or situations. The stories are published with the help of editors who write them down and who train the women in reportage.

Kanta Tomar, the State Commissioner on women's issues, also has only good things to say about the paper: "Mahila Paksh is a unique newspaper of Madhya Pradesh to bring forward various problems of women. Through the initiatives of this paper, we have got lot of help to carry out various activities in the region. The paper is doing a wonderful job in this male dominated society."

== Sources ==
- India's First Women-centric paper. Asia News International, 2007.
- Klein, Lauren D. September 30, 2007. India Paper Taps Marginalized Women as Reporters.
- Khullar, Mridu and Bob Garfield. May 4, 2007. Writing for Their Rights. On the Media: National Public Radio.
